Estancia is a town in Torrance County, New Mexico, United States. As of the 2020 census, the town population was 1,242. It is the county seat of Torrance County.

Estancia is part of the Albuquerque Metropolitan Statistical Area.

History
Estancia is shown as a town “destroyed by enemies” (nomadic Indians) on a famous map made by Don Bernardo de Miera y Pacheco in 1779.

Geography
Estancia is located at  (34.760380, -106.060748).

Demographics

As of the census of 2000, there were 1,584 people, 393 households, and 284 families residing in the town. The population density was 277.7 people per square mile (107.3/km2). There were 487 housing units at an average density of 85.4 per square mile (33.0/km2). The racial makeup of the town was 70.08% White, 10.16% African American, 2.21% Native American, 0.06% Asian, 14.71% from other races, and 2.78% from two or more races. Hispanic or Latino of any race were 50.57% of the population.

Over half the population in 2010 consisted of inmates in the CoreCivic prison on the east side of town, built in 1990. The corporation has threatened to close the prison before October, 2017, saying it will shut down if it cannot be provided with another 300 prisoners to increase its bottom line. It employs 200, and provides a substantial amount of income, $700,000 annually and $300,000 in taxes to the city and county.

There were 393 households, out of which 35.9% had children under the age of 18 living with them, 50.9% were married couples living together, 17.8% had a female householder with no husband present, and 27.7% were non-families. 24.4% of all households were made up of individuals, and 10.2% had someone living alone who was 65 years of age or older. The average household size was 2.70 and the average family size was 3.20.

In the town, the population was spread out, with 20.6% under the age of 18, 10.7% from 18 to 24, 40.2% from 25 to 44, 20.6% from 45 to 64, and 7.9% who were 65 years of age or older. The median age was 34 years. For every 100 females, there were 186.4 males. For every 100 females age 18 and over, there were 217.7 males.

The median income for a household in the town was $24,276, and the median income for a family was $33,750. Males had a median income of $26,932 versus $18,214 for females. The per capita income for the town was $8,479. About 19.9% of families and 25.3% of the population were below the poverty line, including 32.9% of those under age 18 and 13.9% of those age 65 or over.

Climate 
Estancia has a typical New Mexico cool semi-arid climate (Köppen BSk). During the “summer” season from April to June, afternoons change from warm to hot, mornings move from freezing or near-freezing to cool, and the sky is generally very clear. The monsoon season from July to September provides the heaviest precipitation due to frequent thunderstorms, although diurnal temperature ranges remain above . The cool winter half of the year from October to March gradually chills with freezing mornings almost every day. Over a whole year 177.1 mornings fall below freezing although most afternoons even in the depth of winter are cool and sunny and maxima during an average winter top freezing on all but 6.1 afternoons.

References

Towns in Torrance County, New Mexico
Towns in New Mexico
County seats in New Mexico
Albuquerque metropolitan area